The 24th International 500-Mile Sweepstakes Race was held at the Indianapolis Motor Speedway on Saturday, May 30, 1936. The race was part of the 1936 AAA Championship Car season. The race is remembered for three noteworthy Indy traditions getting their start.

Louis Meyer became the first three-time winner of the Indianapolis 500. He notably celebrated in victory lane with a bottle of buttermilk, which later started the famous tradition of serving milk in victory lane at Indianapolis.

Lawson Harris served as Meyer's riding mechanic. Harris, who also rode with Meyer in 1933, became the first two-time Indianapolis 500 winning riding mechanic.

The Borg-Warner Trophy debuted for the winner in 1936. Also, pace car driver Tommy Milton suggested that the race winner should be awarded the official pace car as part of his complement of prizes. Louis Meyer was given the keys to the Packard after the race, and it has been a tradition ever since (with only a handful of exceptions).

Time trials
Ten-lap (25 mile) qualifying runs were utilized. Rex Mays won the pole position for the second consecutive year.

Results

Alternates
First alternate: Al Putman

Failed to Qualify

George Bailey  (#51)
Henry Banks  (#29)
Rick Decker (#44)
Dave Evans (#25)
Dusty Fahrnow (#55)
Tony Gulotta (#31, #56)
Harry Hunt  (#58)
Luther Johnson (#49) - Withdrew
Roy Painter  (#34)
Kelly Petillo (#10)
Phil Shafer (#26)
Overton Snell  (#24)
Russ Snowberger (#23)
Lucky Teter  - Did not appear
Joel Thorne  - Did not appear
George Wingerter (#57)

Race summary

To slow the cars, a fuel limit of 37.5 gallons of gasoline was implemented for the race distance. Engine tuners struggled to make their engines more efficient.

At the start, polesitter Rex Mays led but soon dropped out with a faulty throttle. Wilbur Shaw then took the lead, but lost time with a 17-minute pit stop to re-fasten loose rivets on his engine hood.

Louis Meyer steadily moved up through the field and took the lead by halfway. He pitted for fuel at 350 miles, allowing Ted Horn to take the point. But Meyer caught him, pulled away and became the first 3-time "500" winner. He wasn't sure his fuel would last until the end. He said, "That last lap, I held my breath."

For 1936, riding mechanics were required.
After numerous fatalities in the 1935 race, additional safety measures were introduced for 1936. All new drivers were required to pass a rookie test prior to qualifying. In addition, the inside wall was removed in several locations, the outside walls were angled inward to keep cars from going over them, and several portions of the track were paved over in asphalt. In a sharp contrast to previous years, the 1936 race saw zero fatalities amongst the competitors and/or spectators. It marked the only year from the span of 1929-1940 (the Depression Era) in which no fatalities occurred at the Speedway.
Bill Cummings car failed to pull away from the grid due to clutch and transmission failure. He became the first driver in Indy history to line up for the grid, but fail to pull away and start the race.

References

Indianapolis 500 races
Indianapolis 500
Indianapolis 500
1936 in American motorsport